Manuel Brunet (born 16 November 1985) is an Argentine field hockey player. At the 2012 Summer Olympics, he competed for the Argentina national team. Manuel won the bronze medal at the 2014 World Cup and two gold medals at the Pan American Games.

Manuel plays at Royal Daring Hockey Club in Belgium since 2012.

He is currently sponsored by Ritual Hockey.

References

External links
 

1985 births
Living people
Argentine male field hockey players
Argentine people of French descent
Field hockey players at the 2012 Summer Olympics
Olympic field hockey players of Argentina
Field hockey players at the 2011 Pan American Games
Field hockey players at the 2015 Pan American Games
Field hockey players at the 2016 Summer Olympics
Pan American Games gold medalists for Argentina
Olympic gold medalists for Argentina
Olympic medalists in field hockey
Medalists at the 2016 Summer Olympics
Pan American Games medalists in field hockey
Medalists at the 2011 Pan American Games
Medalists at the 2015 Pan American Games
Sportspeople from Rosario, Santa Fe
2010 Men's Hockey World Cup players
2014 Men's Hockey World Cup players
21st-century Argentine people